A total lunar eclipse took place at the Moon's descending node of the orbit on Monday, November 7, 1938, the second of two lunar eclipses in 1938, with an umbral eclipse magnitude of 1.35251. It was visible in the Americas, Europe, Asia, Asia and west in Oceania. The Moon was plunged into darkness for 1 hour, 21 minutes and 25.9 seconds, in a deep total eclipse which saw the Moon 35.251% of its diameter inside the Earth's umbral shadow. The visual effect of this depends on the state of the Earth's atmosphere, but the Moon may have been stained a deep red colour. The partial eclipse lasted for 3 hours, 30 minutes and 12.5 seconds in total. Occurring only 3.2 days before perigee (Perigee on Friday, November 11, 1938), the Moon's apparent diameter was 2% larger than average.

Visibility

Related lunar eclipses

Half-Saros cycle
A lunar eclipse will be preceded and followed by solar eclipses by 9 years and 5.5 days (a half saros). This lunar eclipse is related to two annular solar eclipses of Solar Saros 132.

See also
List of lunar eclipses
List of 20th-century lunar eclipses

Notes

External links

1938-11
1938 in science